The Ellie Mae Classic was a golf tournament on the Korn Ferry Tour. It was first played in 2009 at TPC Stonebrae (previously known as Stonebrae Country Club), in Hayward, California.

The inaugural event had a prize fund of $600,000 with $108,000 going to the winner, Australian Michael Sim who shot a final round 64 to triumph by 6 strokes. The 2010 event had the same purse and American Kevin Chappell won his first Nationwide Tour event. Daniel Chopra of Sweden won the 2011 event, shortened to 54 holes after fog delayed and then canceled the fourth round.

The event was not played in 2013 due to construction of a new clubhouse, but returned in 2014. In 2016, Stephan Jäger set the 18-hole scoring record (58) and 72-hole scoring record (250) on the Web.com Tour at this tournament. In 2017, basketball's Stephen Curry of the Golden State Warriors, accepted a sponsor's exemption into the Ellie Mae Classic field and shot 74 in both the first and second rounds of the tournament, missing the cut.

Winners

Bolded golfers graduated to the PGA Tour via the Korn Ferry Tour regular-season money list.

Notes

References

External links
Coverage on the Korn Ferry Tour's official site

Former Korn Ferry Tour events
Golf in California
Sports in Hayward, California
Recurring sporting events established in 2009
Recurring sporting events disestablished in 2019
2009 establishments in California
2019 disestablishments in California